Antonio Cerrotti (14 July 1901 – 27 July 1979) was an Argentine footballer. He played in three matches for the Argentina national football team from 1923 to 1925. He was also part of Argentina's squad for the 1925 South American Championship.

References

External links
 

1901 births
1979 deaths
Argentine footballers
Argentina international footballers
Place of birth missing
Association football forwards
Boca Juniors footballers
RC Celta de Vigo players
El Porvenir footballers
Barracas Central players
Argentine expatriate footballers
Expatriate footballers in Spain